The Volkswagen Type 183, more commonly known as the Iltis (German for polecat), is a military vehicle built by Volkswagen for use by the German military.  The Iltis was formerly built under licence in Canada by Bombardier Inc.

Although the two vehicles were briefly offered simultaneously, the Type 183 effectively replaced the Type 181.

History
The German military had been part of a cooperative effort, beginning in the late 1960s, to create what was dubbed the "Europa Jeep", an amphibious four wheel drive vehicle that could replace the small all-terrain transport vehicles being used by several of the participating governments. With development taking longer than expected, the German military requested for something inexpensive to be built in small quantities to fill their need for additional small transport vehicles while the Europa Jeep project was still undergoing design research. Volkswagen responded to the request, designing an updated version of their Kübelwagen and designating it the Type 181. But by 1979, the Europa Jeep project had fallen apart completely, the victim of skyrocketing costs and difficult development. Needing a suitable four-wheel drive vehicle to take over the spots that had been designated for the Europa Jeep, the German government issued requests to several manufacturers to design and build prototype vehicles to be considered for military use.

Prior to the advent of Type 181, the German military had purchased several thousand vehicles of the Munga, a light jeep manufactured by DKW, but the production of the Munga had ended in 1968. Volkswagen had then consolidated the former Auto Union marques into a single company, re-using the Audi name to designate vehicles manufactured by the company rather than continuing to manufacture vehicles under the names of the various brands that had made up the original Auto Union.

Wanting to immediately begin making use of the technologies they had acquired in the Auto Union purchase, VW chose to participate in the competition to provide the next new German military vehicle by creating an evolution of the Munga jeep, which had been out of production for several years by this time. The German armed forces were anxious to replace the outdated two-stroke machine. The resultant prototype combined old technologies with new, and executives decided to badge the product as a VW rather than as an Audi in the hopes that this would help promote positive linking to the existing VW military designs and give them an advantage over their competition.

The vehicle, developed by Audi, featured a variation of the Munga's platform with newly modified suspension components, a four-wheel-drive system based around components from the Audi 100, and a 1.7 litre four-cylinder Volkswagen engine producing . The design of this four-wheel drive system provided the basis for Audi's quattro system, which debuted four years later, in 1980, on the original Audi Quattro. Earlier that year, Freddy Kottulinsky and Gerd Löffelmann had won the Paris-Dakar Rally in an Audi-prepared Iltis.

The Iltis, as VW was now calling it, passed the German government's tests with ease, and was chosen over the equally competent but more expensive Mercedes-Benz G-Wagen. Production began in the summer of 1978 and the first 200 units were delivered in November; by late 1979 approximately 2,000 units had been delivered with 310 units sent to the Luftwaffe and 20 sent to the German Navy. Although most of the units produced were four-doored with open tops, ambulance, anti-tank, artillery survey, command and field communications units with varying body styles were produced in small numbers.

A civilian model was also offered, mostly in Germany. It was first shown at the 1979 Geneva Motor Show and entered production soon thereafter, originally only with a utilitarian soft top. The civilian Iltis found even fewer takers than the 181 had, largely due to price and its utilitarian nature.

Bombardier Iltis

Volkswagen announced the construction of a $CAD 100 million dollar plant to be constructed after Bombardier received the rights to manufacture the Iltis in Canada. Volkwagen picked Barrie, Ontario, at first, but agreed to allow the vehicles to be constructed in Valcourt, Quebec, instead.

In 1983, Ottawa announced the purchase of 1,900 Iltises for $CAD 68 million, with a grant of $CAD 1.3 million grant to expand the production line and $CAD 700,000 for Bombardier to manufacture and market a civilian version of the Iltis. In 1984, Bombardier-made Iltises were sold to Belgium. In 1985, Ottawa purchased 600 Iltises under a $CAD 15-million contract.

All Bombardier production was halted by 1986.

Specifications
The engine has a low 8.2: 1 compression ratio, allowing it to run on low-octane gasoline. The four-wheel drive is engaged by a lever on the floor, as are the optional differential locks. The car has rack-and-pinion steering and many suspension parts are the same at all four corners. The interior is minimal, although the seats, from the contemporary Volkswagen Passat, were considered surprisingly comfortable by period observers. The tiny back seat has two individually folding seatbacks, but can be considered mainly an occasional seat.

The Iltis with Citroën engine
In the late 1970s, the French government decided it was time to replace their aging fleet of Hotchkiss Jeeps and like Germany, they too called out for offers. No French company had a fitting vehicle on hand and designing one from the ground up would have been too expensive so they worked with the manufacturers that did have something to offer. Peugeot teamed up with Mercedes, put 504 petrol or diesel engines in the G-Wagen and called it the P4 ("VLTT" originally), Saviem put a 1647 cc Renault 20 engine in Fiat's Campagnola chassis and dubbed it the TRM500 and Citroën built the Citroën C-44, a Volkswagen Iltis-based vehicle powered by a  1.8 litre Douvrin engine.

The P4 was awarded the contract and the other two projects were scrapped, but a team entered a C-44 in the 1981 Paris–Dakar Rally. It did not finish the race.

Operators

 : Argentine Army
 : Hellenic Army
 : Army of the Republic of Macedonia

Former operators
 : 2,673 vehicles for the Belgian Land Component from Bombardier.  
 : 2,500 vehicles were ordered for the Canadian Forces to replace the existing fleets of M151A2, M38A1 and CJ-7 before being replaced by the G-Wagon in the late 2000s. One known to be on display courtesy of the Electrical and Mechanical Engineers workshops at Canadian Forces Base Ottawa and another from the 15th Field Artillery Regiment Museum & Archives.

References

Notes

Bibliography

See also

FMC XR311
HMMWV
Fabrique Nationale AS 24
M151

Iltis
Military vehicles introduced in the 1970s
Military light utility vehicles
Military vehicles of Germany
Off-road vehicles
Dakar Rally winning cars
Cold War military vehicles of Germany